David Nolan (born December 5, 1992) is an American swimmer and partner at Commit Analytics.  He won two gold medals at the 2009 Jr. Pan Pacific Championships in the 200 IM and 400 medley relay.  Nolan swam at and graduated from Stanford University. He set the National High School record for the 200y IM.

Early life
Nolan was born in Hershey Pennsylvania to parents Theresa and James Nolan.

Career

High School Swimming
In 2011 Nolan set 4 national high school records.  He swam for Hershey High School as well as Hershey Aquatic Club.  When committing to Stanford, Nolan had 5 national high school records, 7 state high school records, and was a high school All American.

College Swimming
Nolan swam for and graduated from Stanford University.  He completed a degree in biomechanical engineering and a minor in computer science.

In 2015 he set the American Record in the 200y IM, swimming 1:40.07.  The swim was one hundredth of a second faster than the previous record set by Ryan Lochte.  He ended his college swimming career with 3 team records, 9 conference titles and 17 All-American honors. In 2014-15 his training focused on speed, whereas during the two years prior were almost pure aerobic training.

Post Graduate Swimming
In 2015 Nolan graduated from Stanford University and moved to Arizona to train under Bob Bowman. In 2016 Nolan swam in the US Olympic Trials in Omaha.

References

Living people
1992 births
American male medley swimmers
American male backstroke swimmers
American male butterfly swimmers
American male freestyle swimmers
People from Hershey, Pennsylvania
Swimmers from Pennsylvania
Stanford Cardinal men's swimmers
Stanford University alumni
21st-century American people